Three ships of the Royal Navy have been named HMS Melita, named after the island of Malta:

 , launched in 1888 was a  composite screw sloop, the only Royal Navy warship ever built in Malta.  She swapped names with HMS Ringdove in 1915 and was sold as a salvage vessel to Falmouth Docks Board in 1920, when her name was changed to Ringdove's Aid. She was sold again in 1927 to the Liverpool & Glasgow Salvage Association, who changed her name to Restorer, and she was finally broken up in 1937.
  HMS Melita was launched in 1889 as the  composite screw gunboat . She became a salvage vessel in 1915 and was renamed HMS Melita (when the first Melita was renamed Ringdove).  She was sold in 1920.

See also
 , four ships of the Royal Navy named for the island of Malta.

Royal Navy ship names